The 2018–19 WPBL season was the 28th season of the Russian Women's Basketball Premier League. UMMC Ekaterinburg were the defending champions.

Player movement

Regular season

Playoffs

Placement round

Russian clubs in European competitions

References

External links
 WPBL Official Website (in Russian)

201819
2018–19 in Russian basketball
Russia